Lot 14 is a township in Prince County, Prince Edward Island, Canada.  It is part of Richmond Parish. Lot 14 was awarded to Captain John Campbell, RN in the 1767 land lottery.

Communities

Incorporated municipalities:

 Lady Slipper

Civic address communities:

 Arlington
 Bayside
 Birch Hill
 Grand River
 Harmony
 Richmond
 St-Gilbert
 St-Hubert
 St-Philippe
 Urbainville
 Wellington Centre
 Wellington

References

14
Geography of Prince County, Prince Edward Island